The Men's FIH Hockey Junior World Cup, formerly known as the Hockey Junior World Cup, is an international field hockey competition organized by the International Hockey Federation (FIH). The tournament was started in 1979. Since 1985 it has been held every four years.With the exception of the 2021 tournament,competitors must be under the age of 21 as of December 31 in the year before the tournament is held.

There is also a corresponding event for the women's junior teams. This competition started in 1989 and uses the same format as the men's event.

Five countries have dominated the event's history. Germany is the most successful team, having won the tournament six times followed by Argentina and India, having won the tournament two times. Australia and Pakistan have each won the tournament once.

The 2009 Junior World Cup was held jointly between Malaysia and Singapore, with Germany defeating the Netherlands 3–1 in the final. The 2013 tournament was held in India from 2 to 17 November 2013. Germany won the final for record 6th time defeating France 5–2. France claimed their first-ever medal in the tournament winning silver after losing to Germany.

The 2016 edition was held between 8–18 December 2016 in Lucknow, India, with India defeating Belgium 2–1 in the final. India also became the first host nation to win the Junior World Cup. India are also the first and only nation to win any type of medal in junior world cup as a host.

Format
The Junior Hockey World Cup consists of a qualification stage and a final tournament stage. All the participating teams in the final tournament play in the qualification tournament.

Qualification
All the teams who wish to qualify for the final tournament play in the relevant continental junior championships. Each continental federation receives at least two finals places and the FIH determines which federations will receive additional places.

Final tournament
The final tournament features the continental champions and other qualified teams. In the tournament in 2009, the teams played a round robin phase, with the two top teams in each pool advancing to a medal-round and remaining teams playing for classification positions. The composition of the pools is determined using the current world rankings.

Results

Summaries

Successful national teams

* = host nation

Team appearances

See also
Men's FIH Hockey World Cup
Women's FIH Hockey Junior World Cup

Notes

References

International field hockey competitions
 
World youth sports competitions
Recurring sporting events established in 1979